The 2012 CAF Confederation Cup group stage matches took place between August and October 2012. The matchdays were 3–5 August, 17–19 August, 31 August–2 September, 14–16 September, 5–7 October, and 19–21 October.

The group stage featured the eight winners from the play-off round. They were divided into two groups of four, where they played each other home-and-away in a round-robin format. The top two teams in each group advanced to the semifinals.

Seeding
The draw for the play-off round and group stage was held on 15 May 2012, 14:00 UTC+02:00, at the CAF Headquarters in Cairo. For the group stage draw, the winners of the play-off round ties involving the two teams seeded in the play-off round (using their individual 2007–2011 5-Year team Ranking) were seeded into Pot 1, and the winners of the remaining ties were seeded into Pot 2. Each group contained one team from Pot 1 and three teams from Pot 2.

Notes
Winners of each tie shown in bold

Tiebreakers
The order of tie-breakers used when two or more teams have equal number of points is:
Number of points obtained in games between the teams concerned
Goal difference in games between the teams concerned
Away goals scored in games between the teams concerned
Goal difference in all games
Goals scored in all games

Groups

Group A

Group B

References

External links
CAF Confederation Cup

Group stage